Adem Bereket (born Adam Barakhoyev 19 July 1973) is an Ingush-Turkish wrestler. He was Olympic bronze medalist in Freestyle wrestling in 2000. He won a bronze medal at the 1999 World Wrestling Championships. He is member of the İstanbul Büyükşehir Belediyesi S.K.

References

External links 
 

1973 births
Living people
Olympic wrestlers of Turkey
Wrestlers at the 2000 Summer Olympics
Turkish male sport wrestlers
Olympic bronze medalists for Turkey
Olympic medalists in wrestling
People from Ingushetia
Medalists at the 2000 Summer Olympics
20th-century Turkish people
21st-century Turkish people